Taiwan This Month is a free monthly tourist magazine aimed at providing essential information to business travelers, tourists and immigrants to Taiwan, with a focus on people between 28 and 55 years of age.

Founded in early 2009 by Louise Bystrom, Elizabeth Lim and Chang Chih-Tsung, Taiwan this Month is distributed to 26 countries around the world and over 300 locations in Taiwan.

The magazine is written mainly in English and Chinese, with plans underway to provide Korean and Japanese editions.

Distribution
Taiwan this Month is distributed to 26 countries worldwide and can be found in 23 of Ministry of Foreign Affairs overseas offices.

To mention a few places in Europe: Stockholm, Helsinki, Madrid, Paris and London, in Asia: Singapore, Bangkok, New Delhi and Seoul and North America: Toronto.

Further more, in the ticketing offices for China Airlines, apart from cities mentioned, Vienna and Amsterdam in Europe, Vancouver, San Francisco, Los Angeles, Seattle and New York in North America, as well as Tokyo and Brisbane. Taoyuan International Airport and Kaohsiung International Airport are also covered.

Overseas distribution every month via air mail
 Taipei Mission in Sweden - Address: Wenner-Gren Center, Sveavagen 166, 18tr, 113 46 Stockholm, Sweden
 Taipei Representative Office in Finland - Address: Aleksanterinkatu 17, 4th floor, 00100 Helsinki, Finland
 Oficina Economica y Cultural de Taipei, Madrid, Espana - Address: Calle Rosario Pino 14 – 16, Piso 18, Dcha. 28020 Madrid, Spain
 Bureau de Representation de Taipei en France - Address: 78, rue de L'Université, 75007 Paris, France
 Taipei Representation Office in the United Kingdom - Address: 50 Grosvenor Gardens, London SW1W OEB, United Kingdom
 Taipei Representation Office in Singapore - Address: 460 Alexandra Rd., # 23-00, PSA Build., Singapore 119963
 Taipei Economic & Cultural Office in Thailand - Address: 20F, Empire Tower, 195 South Sathorn Rd., Bangkok 10120 Thailand
 Taipei Economic and Cultural Center in New Delhi - Address: 84 Poorvi Marg, Vasant Vihar New Delhi 110057, India
 Taipei Mission in Korea Seoul Korea - Address: 6F, Kwang Hwa Moon Build. 211, Sejong-Ro, Chongro-Ku, Seoul, Korea 110-050
 Taipei Economic & Cultural Office, Toronto - Address: 151 Yong Street, Suite 501, Toronto, Ontario, M5C 2W7, Canada
 Taipei Representation Office in Ireland - Address: 8 Lower Hatch Street, Dublin 2, Ireland
 Taipei Economic and Cultural Office, Prague, Czech Republic - Address: Evropska 33c, 160 00 Praha 6, Czech Republic
 Taipeh Vertretung in der Bundesrepublik Deutschland, Buro Hamburg - Address: Mittelweg 144/2 OG 20148 Hamburg, Germany
(Only partial of the overseas distribution sites are listed above. Contact information can be obtained through Ministry of Foreign Affairs' website.)

In Taiwan our magazine Taiwan this Month will be at prominent venues

Financial Institution
 HSBC Bank, Taipei
 HSBC Bank, Panchiao
 HSBC Bank, Sanchung
 HSBC Bank, Taoyuan
 HSBC Bank, Hsinchu
 HSBC Bank, Funyuan
 HSBC Bank, Taichung
 HSBC Bank, Changhwa
 HSBC Bank, Chayi
 HSBC Bank, Tainan
 HSBC Bank, Kaohsiung (and over 50 HSBC branches)
 Primasia Funds, Taipei
Museums
 Beitou Museum, Taipei
 Juming Museum, Taipei
 Museum of World Religions, Taipei
 Miniatures Museum of Taiwan, Taipei
 Taipei Fork Arts Museum, Taipei
 Taipei Film House, Taipei
 Taiwan Handicraft Promotion Center, Taipei
 Chi Mei Museum, Tainan
Schools
 Taipei American School, Taipei
 Taipei European School, Taipei
 Goethe-Institut Taipei, Taipei
 Hsinchu International School, Hsinchu
Clubs
 American Club Taipei, Taipei
 World Trade Center, Taipei
 Rotary Club of Taipei, Taipei
 Rotary Club of Taipei Ta-Chiao, Taipei
Hotels
 Chateau De Chine, Taipei
 Hotel Quote, Taipei
 Novotel, Taoyuan
 Hotel Royal-Taipei, Taipei
 Fleur De Chine Hotel, Nantou
 Shangri-La's Far Eastern Plaza Hotel Taipei, Taipei
 Shangri-La's Far Eastern Plaza Hotel Tainan, Tainan
 Novotel Hotels Taipei Taoyuan International Airport, Taipei
 The Howard Plaza Kaohsiung, Kaohsiung
 Ceasar Park Hotel Taipei, Taipei
 Imperial Hotel Taipei, Taipei 
 Lai-Lai Sheraton, Taipei 
 Les Suites Taipei, Taipei
 The Landis Taipei Hotel, Taipei 
 Miramar Garden Taipei, Taipei 
 Park Taipei, Taipei 
 Hotel Royal Taipei, Taipei
 The Riviera Hotel, Taipei
 Sunworld Dynasty, Taipei
 Sato Castle Hotel, Taipei
 The Sherwood Taipei, Taipei
 Taipei Garden Hotel, Taipei
 Westin Taipei Hotel, Taipei
 YMCA Hotel, Taipei
 Holiday Inn Express Taoyuan, Taoyuan
 Taoyuan Chinatrust Landmark Hotel, Taoyuan
 Jungli Chinatrust Hotel, Zhongli
 Evergreen Laurel Hotel, Taichung
 Howard Prince Hotel Taichung, Taichung
 Hotel National, Taichung
 Hotel One, Taichung
 Plaza International Hotel, Taichung
 Splendor Hotel, Taichung
 The Lalu Sun Moon Lake, Nantou
 Promised Land Resort & Lagoon, Hualien
 Grand Hi-Lai Hotel, Kaohsiung
 Ambassador Hotel, Taipei
 Evergreen International Hotels, Taipei
 Grand Formosa Regent, Taipei
 Grand Forward Hotel, Taipei 
 Grand Hyatt Hotel, Taipei 
 The Grand Hotel, Taipei
 The Howard Plaza Hotel Taipei, Taipei
 Holiday Inn East Taipei, Taipei
 Evergreen Laurel Hotel, Taipei
Restaurants, Night Clubs, Wine Shops 
 Flavors of Sweden, Taipei
 Marquee Restaurant, Taipei
 Space Club, Taipei
 Sommelier Wine Expert, Taipei

Content
Taiwan this Month provides its readers with information such as

 dining,
 shopping and
 entertainment.

The magazine provides information on Taiwan’s major cities including:

 Taipei
 Pingtung
 Kinmen
 Yilan
 Chayi
 Hualien
 Hsinchu
 Taichung
 Changhua
 Tainan
 Kaohsiung

The magazine provides emergency information such as contact numbers for police, fire fighters and hospitals. Taiwan this Month also provides information regarding the opening hours of department stores and restaurants, and acceptable credit cards in Taiwan. Simple phrases in Chinese are also included in the magazine to help tourists with communicating with the locals.

Taiwan this Month also provides its readers with the most up-to-date news and information regarding the happenings in Taiwan. Each issue has feature articles on upcoming events of the month.

Local interest magazines